Arcoptilia pongola is a moth of the family Pterophoridae. It is known from South Africa.

References

Endemic moths of South Africa
Exelastini
Moths of Africa
Moths described in 2010